Waldenberg Messias Coelho (born 27 January 1989), commonly known as Berg, is a Brazilian professional footballer who is currently a free agent.

He is a versatile attacker and can play as an attacking midfielder.

References

External links

Thefinalball profile

1989 births
Living people
Association football midfielders
Brazilian footballers
Brazilian expatriate footballers
Hong Kong Rangers FC players
Hong Kong Premier League players
Expatriate footballers in Hong Kong
Brazilian expatriate sportspeople in Hong Kong
People from Maceió
Sportspeople from Alagoas